Japanese composer Joe Hisaishi has released 26 studio albums, 13 compilation albums, and 83 soundtrack albums. Hisaishi has also released five video albums.

Albums

Studio albums

Compilation albums

Video albums

Soundtracks

Other album appearances

Published scores
(released by Zen-On Music Company Ltd.)

Published by Schott Music Tokyo.

Unpublished scores
There are numerous television and cinema soundtracks created by Joe Hisaishi that were never released for sale, such as.

TV Scores
 First Human Giatrus (1974–1976)
 Robokko Beeton (1976–1977)
 Tonde Mon Pe (1982–1983)
 Sasuga no Sarutobi (1982–1984)
 Galactic Whirlwind Sasuraiger (1983–1984)
 Genesis Climber Mospeada (1983–1984)
 Twin Hawks (1984–1985)
 Honoo no Alpen Rose: Judy & Randy (1985–1986)
Movie, OVA, Special Scores
 Mr. Glory Giant's Squad 3 (1981) (with Takeo Watanabe)
 Two Down Full Base (1982)
 Techno Police 21C (1982)
 The Wizard of Oz (1982)
 Genesis Climber Mospeada: Love, Live, Alive (1985)
 Ōke no Monshō (1988)
Video Game Scores
 Zoids: Battle of the Central Continent (1987)
 Zoids 2: Zenbase Strikes Back (1989)
 Tengai Makyō II: Manjimaru (1992) (with Yasuhiko Fukuda)
Soundtrack Works
 Mahō Shōjo Lalabel (1980–1981)
 Voltron (1981–1982)
 Hello! Sandybell (1981–1982)
 Meiken Jolie (1981–1982)
 Mobile Suit Gundam: The Movie Trilogy (1981–1982) (did music arrangements and additional music to Soldiers of Sorrow and Encounters in Space)
 Ai Shite Knight (1983–1984)
 Creamy Mami, the Magic Angel: Curtain Call (1986)
 Kimagure Orange Road: The Movie (1988)

References

External links
Official Website 
 
 

Discographies of Japanese artists